Maria Vittoria Trio (born 18 December 1947 in Turin) is a retired Italian long jumper

Biography
In 1966, before the 1966 European Athletics Championships, after the introduction of the gender verification testing in sports, she was asked to undergo, but Trio, like many athletes at the time, refused and preferred to withdraw from the competitions in 1967.

In 2012, her 6.52 m, after 45 years, is still the ninth best all-time Italian performance.

Achievements

National titles
She has twice won the individual national championship.
2 wins in the long jump (1965, 1968)

See also
 Italian all-time top lists - Long jump
 Italian record progression women's long jump

References

External links
 

1947 births
Living people
Sportspeople from Turin
Italian female long jumpers
Athletes (track and field) at the 1964 Summer Olympics
Olympic athletes of Italy
Mediterranean Games gold medalists for Italy
Athletes (track and field) at the 1967 Mediterranean Games
Mediterranean Games medalists in athletics
20th-century Italian women